Bert van Loo (Gulpen, 1946 – 2016) was a Dutch sculptor, who mainly worked with glass. He was mainly active in the Netherlands and China.

Biography
Bert van Loo acquired his sculptors education from 1969 to 1973 at the Gerrit Rietveld Academy in Amsterdam. Van Loo worked mainly with the material glass, mostly in combination with the materials bronze, lead, stone and wood. Van Loo was a teacher and guest teacher at the Gerrit Rietveld Academy, Amsterdam, Royal College of Art, Londen, Kent State University, Kent, Ohio, US, and many other art academies in Europe, US, Japan, Australia and China.
From 1975 until 2014, Bert van Loo was also advisor and curator for multiple organisations like the Council for Culture in The Hague, the Mondriaan Fund in Amsterdam, the Government of Amsterdam, Amstelveen and also for the Levant Art Gallery in Shanghai, China.

He realized works in the public space in the Netherlands and also in China.
Bert van Loo had solo exhibitions as well with fellow artists in the Netherlands and most European countries, as well as America, Australia, Japan and China.

He won different awards and in 2006 he received a retrospective: in Museum Fundación Centro Del Vidrio, La Granja – Segovia, Spain. His work is in the collection of different museum's, private collections and corporate collections.

Art works Bert van Loo

External links
 Website Bert Van Loo
 Website of The Dutch Society of Sculptors (NKVB) with Bert van Loo's work
Website of the Real Fábrica de Cristales de La Granja (Fundación Centro Del Vidrio) – the museum of Vidrio, Spain, with a retrospective of Bert van Loo

References

1946 births
2016 deaths
20th-century Dutch artists
21st-century Dutch artists
20th-century sculptors
21st-century sculptors
Dutch sculptors
Dutch male sculptors
Artists from Amsterdam
Dutch glass artists
20th-century Dutch male artists